Ochromima is a genus of longhorn beetles of the subfamily Lamiinae, containing the following species:

 Ochromima marginicollis (Gahan, 1889)
 Ochromima megalopoides (Bates, 1866)
 Ochromima pallipes (Olivier, 1795)

References

Hemilophini